Howard Hawkins may refer to:

 Howie Hawkins (born 1952), American politician and activist
 Howard Hawkins (businessman) (1932–2015), American bicycle tools maker